The Bde Maka Ska Public Art Project is part of the Minneapolis Park and Recreation Board's Bde Maka Ska–Harriet Master Plan. In parallel with (but separate from) the restoring the name of Lake Calhoun to its Dakota name, Bde Maka Ska, a public art project was initiated to commemorate Ḣeyata Oṭuŋwe, a 19th-century Dakota agricultural community on the southeast bank of Bde Maka Ska, and its founder, Dakota leader Maḣpiya Wic̣aṡṭa (Cloud Man).

Project elements 
The project's artwork pieces, collectively "" (Brave Change), include a public gathering place with a circular stone seating area, ornamental panels forming a railing, and a pedestrian path with stampings depicting and naming various local crops (notably corn and wild rice) and wildlife.

The site incorporates an existing memorial plaque, reading, "To perpetuate the memory of the Sioux or Dakota Indians who occupied this region for more than two centuries prior to the treaties of 1851. This tablet is erected by the Minnesota Society of Daughters of the American Colonists, 1930."

A project website includes material on the history of the site and of the project itself. Interpretive signage, a collaboration between the park board and descendants, (pending funding) is planned for the project's next step.

See also 

 East Bde Maka Ska, Minneapolis
Sioux language writing systems

References

External links 
 Project website
 
 MPRB Calhoun/Bde Maka Ska – Harriet Master Plan Report: Introduction
 MPRB Bde Maka Ska/Mahpiya Wicasta Public Art & Site Improvements
 MPRB Learn more about Bde Maka Ska and Mahpiya Wicasta public art and site improvements at two upcoming public meetings
 CityPages Kate Beane and Carly Bad Heart Bull: The Storytellers
Star-Tribune New Bockley Gallery show reflects history of American Indians in south Minneapolis

Public art in the United States
2018 sculptures